Basketball was one of the 14 sports held at the 2007 Island Games.

Menorca won in both men's and women's competition.

Men's basketball

Group A

Group B

Medal Matches

Women's basketball

Medal Matches

Sources
IslandGames.net: 2007 basketball results

2007 in basketball
Basketball at the Island Games
Basketball
2007–08 in Greek basketball
International basketball competitions hosted by Greece